The TIGR plant repeat database is a repository of repetitive sequences in plants.

See also
 repetitive sequences
 TIGR plant transcript assembly database

References

External links
 http://plantrepeats.plantbiology.msu.edu/index.html

Biological databases
Repetitive DNA sequences